Jieitai-Mae Station (自衛隊前駅) is a rapid transit station in Minami-ku, Sapporo, Hokkaido, Japan. The station number is N15. It is one of the four Sapporo Municipal Subway stations located above-ground (all of which are on the southernmost section of the Namboku Line).

Platforms

Surrounding area
JGSDF, Camp Makomanai
Sapporo Transportation Museum
Sapporo Business Academy
Tokou Store, Jieitai-mae
Sapporo Sumikawa Post Office
Kobiki Mountain

External links
 Sapporo Subway Stations

Railway stations in Japan opened in 1971
Railway stations in Sapporo
Sapporo Municipal Subway
Minami-ku, Sapporo